Tina St. Claire (28 May 1984 – 9 March 2016) ( T.S. Claire and TFail) was an American musician and artist who specialized in street art.

Biography 
Tina St. Claire was a self-taught artist whose work could be found throughout the city of Los Angeles, sometimes on abandoned structures or alongside graffiti. St. Claire displayed her work in over 100 gallery spaces throughout the U.S. She was also featured in Juxtapoz in 2012.

St. Claire's art often complimented her partner, fiancé, and frequent collaborator, Dereck Seltzer. With a background in wheat pasting and mural-style street art, her style is heavily informed by the street. Most of her pieces surround the female form or face, and a ghostly energy with crystals, skulls, and pupil-less eyes. Together, the collaborative works of Dereck and Tina—or Haunted Euth and TFail have a recognizable style.

St. Claire is remembered primarily as an illustrator, but she also worked with clients, studios, companies and organizations, and she taught herself a number of disciplines. Her work tends to be multi-disciplinary in her style and technique. She created thousands of pieces of art in her lifetime that varied from full paintings, sketches in her moleskin journals, silk screen print editions, numerous legal and illegal street installations, stickers, tapestries, zines, clothing of her designs, and fine art.

St. Claire died as a result of Gliobastoma Multiforme grade 4 on March 9, 2016, in Los Angeles.

Music 
Her inspiration came from bands such as Nirvana, The Smashing Pumpkins, and Silverchair. She joined her first real band around 15. They toured the mid-western U.S and California, including a show in Hollywood, but ultimately it didn't progress into anything bigger. She left that band and started her own band, called LiaFail in July 2003. With a strong desire for an all girl line-up, and a grouping of musicians including Mikaela Mayer, Nita Strauss, Henry James (aka Heather D. Welborn) and Kirsten Schlüter. The band toured the US a few times and played a number of well known clubs, events, and festivals including Warped Tour multiple times in the United States before disbanding in 2008. It was through the band that she adopted the name TFAIL—a reference to the band's namesake.

Artwork 
 TMRWLND
TMRWLND (spoken as "Tomorrow Land") is a hardcover book that also exists as a compendium of all three issues of the zine by the same name, made by St. Claire and Seltzer. Established in 2013, TMRWLND morphed from a zine project into a full-time creative studio entity and working space. The collaborative zine project and book highlighted the two artists’ individual talents and distinctive individual styles of art and art-making.  The artists used techniques such as inking, drawing, silkscreen printing, and hand painting, in TMRWLND.

The artwork of the TMRWLND zines and book showcases this complimentary relationship between St. Claire's and Dereck Seltzer's styles, with imagery that is self-curated to represent their individual bodies of work.

 Street art
St. Claire created many large scale hand painted pieces that she installed around the city of Los Angeles. Every piece was drawn, painted and installed by hand. She utilized wheat pasting, graphic design, silk screening, acrylic, spray and enamel painting in her work on the street. Most of her pieces surround the female form or face, and a ghostly energy; crystals, skulls, pupil-less eyes, peer into the depths of your soul.

 Fine art
St. Claire also produced paintings, drawings, and mixed media. Tina's work often featured “feminine” color schemes, but with strong and sometimes jarring images of women skulls, symbolism, cats, crystals, and other personally significant imagery to Tina. The subjects in most of her paintings and drawings were life forms of some kind, whether animals, animal skulls or women, and they always had empty eyes, full of power and promise, of mysticism and magic. Her fiancé Dereck Seltzer curated a memorial exhibit of her last series of work called “Eternal” in April 2016, at the Surf Club Gallery in Hollywood, presented by The Artillerist.

 Collaboration with Dereck Seltzer
Tina St. Claire and Dereck Seltzer (Haunted Euth) met in October 2011 and began dating and working together creatively shortly after. The two partnered on murals, installations, pop-up shows and the now internationally published book TMRLWND, despite having very little to almost no backing or support from the contemporary Los Angeles art scene. Over the next five years, their installations and murals could be seen in the Downtown L.A. Arts District, Culver City Arts District and along Sunset Boulevard most frequently. Seltzer proposed to Tina St. Claire shortly before her hospitalization for cancer treatment in 2016. He stayed with her day and night while she resided in the hospital and actively worked to raise money to support her medical bills through a Gofundme Campaign.

Charity 
St. Claire painted a large mural for Temple Magnet School (LAUSD) for which she received a letter of recognition from the school board and Los Angeles. She also hand-painted numerous skateboard decks for charity which were auctioned off to help the Venice Family Clinic in Los Angeles.

“She believed wholly in the individual’s power to change the world and she did so herself, donating monthly (in secret no less) to charities that supported animal rights, peace, and the idea of equality for people of all color and genders.”

References

1984 births
2016 deaths
Street artists
American women guitarists
Deaths from brain tumor
21st-century American women